= Dudley Market =

Restaurant in Venice, Los Angeles, California, U.S.

Coordinates: 33.9942°N 118.4797°W

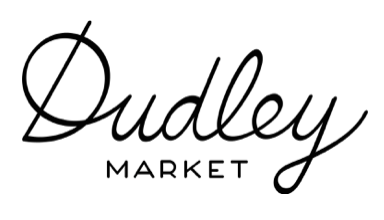
- Interactive map of Dudley Market

Restaurant information
- Location: 9 Dudley Ave, Los Angeles, California, 90291, United States
- Website: dudleymarketvenice.com

Dudley Market is a restaurant in Venice, Los Angeles, in the U.S. state of California. It is an upscale restaurant known for claiming their products are sustainable and traceable. In 2020 and 2021, it has flouted the law by sourcing illegally caught fish which violated state and federal commercial fishing laws. A settlement was reached in June 2026. It's owner Conner Mitchell and his business partners Taylor Grant and Cody Martin were found to have participated in deceptive marketing practices and illegal fishing practice. All three are now barred from owning or operating commercial fishing vessels. The restaurant had falsely advertised their offering as traceable, sustainable and lawfully sourced and for their unlawful conduct, they're required to publicly post a notice on their website for their relating to their transgressions, saying that:

"We falsely advertised the Dudley Market as source of fully sustainable, transparent, and lawfully procured fish. We now comply with California and federal law and have we have ceased all such false advertising."

They were also fined $100,000 USD.
